John Hegre (born 1 February 1967 in Bergen, Norway) is a Norwegian guitarist, songwriter and sound engineer. He has collaborated in bands like Der Brief and Public Enema, together with drummer Nils Are Drønen since 1995.

Career 
Hegre is one of the cornerstones of Norwegian noise music. He completed the sound engineer education at Norwegian lydskole in Oslo (1991), and subsisted for several years as a sound engineer until he decided to make his own music to his main focus at the end of the 1990s.

Hegre started Jazzkammer together with Lasse Marhaug in 1998, and Kaptein Kaliber with David Aasheim in 1999. He is also involved in Golden Serenades with Jørgen Træen, Black Packers with Jean-Philippe Gross, Rehab with Bjørnar Habbestad, Tree People with Morten J. Olsen and Ignaz Schick, NOXAGT with Kjetil Brandsdal and Jan Christian L. Kyvik, Bergen Impro Storband, Skurkeklubben with David Aasheim, Jørgen Træen and Bjørn Torske, Tralten Eller Utpult with Thore Warland and Kristoffer Riis.

Discography 

Solo albums
2003: A Nice Place To Leave (Dekorder)
2005: Snow King (Rape Art) 
2006: Colors don´t clash (Dekorder)

As John Hegre/Lasse Marhaug/Helge Sten
1999: The Comfort of Objects (Ohm Records)

As John Hegre/Lasse Marhaug
2002: Acoustic (Authorised Version)

As John Hegre/Lasse Marhaug/Y Yoshida
2002: Saturday Night Groove Sessions (Xerxes)

As John Hegre/Maja Ratkje
2005: Ballads (Dekorder)

As John Hegre/Howard Stelzer
2007: The Boring Leading The Bored (humbug)

As John Hegre/Lene Grenager/Harald Fetveit/Else Olsen S 
2009: Ute (AIM)

As John Hegre & Marcelo Aguirre & Die Polizei
2009: Live at Adolf 666 (soopa records)

As Irabagon, Hegre & Drønen
2017: Axis (Rune Grammofon)

References

External links 
John Hegre at Audiatur festival

Norwegian guitarists
Norwegian male guitarists
Noise musicians
Norwegian electronic musicians
Norwegian record producers
Norwegian composers
Norwegian male composers
Musicians from Bergen
1967 births
Living people